The Crown Hotel, formerly the Lakeside Hotel is a historic hotel building at 119 West University Street in Siloam Springs, Arkansas.  It is a two-story brick building in an L shape, with a hip roof topped by a low cupola.  It is distinguished by the brickwork at the roofline, and by the delicately spindled two-story porch that wraps around two sides of the building.  Built in 1881, just one year after the city's founding, it is one of the city's oldest commercial buildings, and may have been its first brick hotel.

The building was listed on the National Register of Historic Places in 1979.

See also
National Register of Historic Places listings in Benton County, Arkansas

References

Hotel buildings on the National Register of Historic Places in Arkansas
Hotel buildings completed in 1881
Buildings and structures in Siloam Springs, Arkansas
Hotels in Arkansas
National Register of Historic Places in Benton County, Arkansas
Historic district contributing properties in Arkansas
1881 establishments in Arkansas